The Witch Trials was an English–American rock supergroup originally formed in 1980. In one-off musical collaboration between Jello Biafra (of Dead Kennedys), Adrian Borland (of the Sound), Morgan Fisher (of Mott the Hoople) and Christian Lunch. The group released only one self-titled EP.

The Witch Trials EP
The Witch Trials was recorded in England. According to Biafra, "The Witch Trials is the most evil record I've ever been associated with".

The EP was released in 1981 by Subterranean Records. According to John Trubee of Spin, the EP was released "with virtually no promotion and no information".

Track listing

References

External links 
 

Electropunk musical groups
British supergroups
American supergroups
Rock music supergroups
Musical groups established in 1980
Musical groups disestablished in 1981